The following is a list of theatrical short films featuring the cartoon character Farmer Al Falfa. Each set of films here is separated by studio.

Thanhauser Corporation

Bray Studios

Edison/Conquest Pictures

A. Kay Co.

Paramount

Fables Studios

Van Beuren Studio

Terrytoons

References

External links
Farmer Al Falfa at the Big Cartoon Database

Film series introduced in 1915
Lists of animated films by character
Terrytoons shorts